Jablanica is a village in the municipality of Trnovo, Republika Srpska, Bosnia and Herzegovina.

References 

Populated places in Trnovo, Republika Srpska
Villages in Republika Srpska